Sergey Yakovlevich Feldman (born April 20, 1964) is a professional association football functionary from Russia and a former Soviet player. Currently, he was the general director of the Russian First Division club FC SKA-Energiya Khabarovsk since 2006–2016.

Feldman played in the Soviet First League with SKA Khabarovsk.

External links
Profile at Footballfacts.ru

1964 births
Living people
Soviet footballers
Russian football managers
FC SKA-Khabarovsk players

Association football forwards